Rudra Pandey (born 1963) is a Nepali entrepreneur, currently serving as Founder & Executive Chairman of Deerhold Ltd, an American company providing Software Development and Information Technology services globally. He is also the Chairman of Deerwalk Institute of Technology and the Chairman of Hamro Patro. In 2017, he received the prestigious FNCCI Gold Award (Trendsetters) in the sector of Information Technology.

Education
Pandey holds a bachelor's degree in electronics engineering from Mehran University of Engineering and Technology and a Ph.D. in economics from Northeastern University.

Business

Prior to founding Deerhold Ltd, he founded Deerwalk Inc., a healthcare analytics company based in Lexington, Massachusetts. Deerwalk was acquired by Cedar Gate Technologies in 2020. Deerwalk was featured in a case study "Offshore Pricing with Onshore Management: A Case Study in Innovation and Technology Management".

Before that, Pandey co-founded D2Hawkeye where he served as Chief Technology Officer.  After its acquisition by Verisk Analytics, D2Hawkeye became Verisk Health where Pandey served as Chief Operating Officer. "D2Hawkeye: Growing the Medical IT Enterprise" was a case study at Harvard Business School. D2Hawkeye was a recipient of Governor's Entrepreneurial Spirit Award in 2005.

Earlier in his career, Pandey worked as a parking a booth attendant, business systems engineer, database architect and as a consultant.

Philanthropy
Pandey is involved in social work primarily via Deerwalk Foundation which has been doing work in the area of education, healthcare, tourism, sustainable development, agriculture and sanitation. He has also contributed to organizations like Help Nepal Network.

Family
Pandey was born in Naubise, Dhading, Nepal. He lives with his wife, Muna Joshi, in Lexington, Massachusetts. He has two daughters Erica Pandey and Maia (Mahika) Pandey.

Publications
 Algorithmic Prediction of Health-Care Costs
 Antibiotic Use and Clostridium difficile Infection in the U.S. – A Populatiuon Based Study
 Offshore Pricing with Onshore Management: A Case Study in Innovation and Technology Management
 Angiotensin-converting enzyme inhibitors, angiotensin-receptor blockers, and risk of appendicitis
 Antihypertensive medications and risk of community-acquired pneumonia
 Sleep Quality and Quality of Life in Patients With COPD

Case Studies
 Offshore Pricing with Onshore Management: A Case Study in Innovation and Technology Management
 D2Hawkeye: Growing the Medical IT Enterprise

Media
 Rudra Pandey featured in the article 'Trekking to Nepal -- on business' on Denver Business Journal
 US Ambassador to Nepal, Scott H. DeLisi, commends Rudra Pandey for creating hundreds of high-paying jobs for Nepal’s youth
 Rudra Pandey featured in VenturePlus
 Rudra Pandey on EverestUncensored.org
 Rudra Pandey's hiking achievements on Everest Uncensored
 Opinion on Reconstruction after Earthquake (Nepali)
 Rudra Pandey's Interview in mnsvmag.com
 Youth Legend Nepal Interview : An Expert Take with Rudra Pandey

References

External links
 Deerhold Website
 Deerwalk Institute of Technology Website

1963 births
Living people
People from Dhading District
Nepalese businesspeople
Northeastern University alumni
21st-century Nepalese businesspeople